Leon Root (June 15, 1929 – September 21, 2015) was the former Chief of Pediatric Orthopaedics at the Hospital for Special Surgery. He was President of the American Academy for Cerebral Palsy and Developmental Medicine in 1988. Dr. Root wrote the popular "No More Aching Back" in 1992. He died at the age of 86 in September 2015.

Education
 MD, New York Medical College, New York, New York, US
 Fellowship, Hospital for Special Surgery, New York, New York, US

Selected awards
 President American Academy of Cerebral Palsy and Developmental Medicine 1988
 Chairman Orthopaedic Section of New York Academy of Medicine

Selected writings
 Root, L. "Surgical treatment for hip pain in the adult cerebral palsy patient." Dev Med Child Neurol. 2009 Oct; 51 Suppl 4:84-91. .
 Raphael BS, Dines JS, Akerman M, Root L.. "Long-term followup of total hip arthroplasty in patients with cerebral palsy." Clin Orthop Relat Res. 2010 Jul; 468(7):1845-54. .
 Widmann RF, Laplaza FJ, Bitan FD, Brooks CE, Root L., "Quality of life in osteogenesis imperfecta." Int Orthop. 2002; 26(1):3-6. .

References

1929 births
2015 deaths
American surgeons
New York Medical College alumni
People from Jersey City, New Jersey
American people of Belarusian-Jewish descent
Physicians of Hospital for Special Surgery